"Best Fake Smile" is a song by English singer-songwriter James Bay. It was released in the United Kingdom on 2 March 2016 through Republic Records as the fifth single from his debut studio album Chaos and the Calm (2014).

Music video
A music video to accompany the release of "Best Fake Smile" was first released onto YouTube on 3 March 2016 at a total length of three minutes and fifty-seven seconds.

Track listing

Charts

Weekly charts

Year-end charts

Certifications

Release history

References

2016 singles
2015 songs
James Bay (singer) songs
Song recordings produced by Jacquire King
Songs written by Iain Archer
Republic Records singles